20 successi di Mina is a compilation album by Italian singer Mina, issued in 1964.

The songs of this album were all taken from the first six albums published between 1960 and 1963, except "Vulcano" that was published in 1963 only on a 45rpm record.

Track listing

Side A

Side B

1964 compilation albums
Mina (Italian singer) compilation albums
Italian-language compilation albums